Robert Emmett McCarthy (January 12, 1940 – January 15, 2022) was an American lawyer and politician from Massachusetts.

Education
McCarthy attended the United States Military Academy from 1957 to 1961 and graduated with a Bachelor of Science degree. He graduated from Boston College Law School with a Bachelor of Laws degree in 1967.

Military service
Upon graduation from West Point, McCarthy was commissioned a Second Lieutenant in the Infantry branch of the United States Army. From 1962 to 1963 he served with the 503rd and 325th Airborne Infantry Regiments of the 82nd Airborne Division. He resigned his commission in 1964 as a First Lieutenant.

Legal career
McCarthy practiced law in East Bridgewater, Massachusetts, after graduating from law school.

Political career
From 1969 to 1975 McCarthy served on the East Bridgewater Board of Selectmen. From 1971 to 1975 he served in the Massachusetts House of Representatives representing the 8th Plymouth district as a Democrat. From 1975 to 1981 he served in the Massachusetts Senate representing the Bristol, Plymouth and Norfolk district (1975–1879) and the 2nd Plymouth district (1979–1881). He was also an unsuccessful candidate for the United States House of Representatives seat in Massachusetts's 10th congressional district in 1980.

From 2001 to 2015 he served as Register of Probate for Plymouth County, Massachusetts.

References

1940 births
2022 deaths
Boston College Law School alumni
Massachusetts lawyers
Democratic Party Massachusetts state senators
Democratic Party members of the Massachusetts House of Representatives
People from East Bridgewater, Massachusetts
United States Military Academy alumni
20th-century American lawyers
21st-century American lawyers
United States Army officers
20th-century American politicians
21st-century American politicians
Military personnel from Massachusetts
County officials in Massachusetts
Selectmen in Massachusetts